Orléans Cathedral (French: Basilique Cathédrale Sainte-Croix d'Orléans) is a Roman Catholic church located in the city of Orléans, France. The cathedral is the seat of the Bishop of Orléans.

It was originally built from 1278 to 1329. It was partially destroyed in 1568 by the Huguenots during the French Wars of Religion, but was rebuilt between 1601 and 1829. The edifice is in the Gothic architectural style.

During the Siege of Orléans, the cathedral was visited frequently by Joan of Arc. The cathedral's stained glass windows now depict the story of Joan's actions that contributed to the lifting of the siege.

Burials

John Stewart of Darnley

See also
List of Gothic Cathedrals in Europe

References

“Orléans Cathedral.” ( albumen print from 1857), A. D. White Architectural Photographs Collection, Cornell University Rare and Manuscript Collections (15/5/3090.01

Sources and external links

 Orleans Cathedral - World History Encyclopedia
 Map showing the city in which this church is located.
  Diocese of Orléans official website
 Ministry of Culture: Cathédrale Sainte-Croix d'Orléans
 

Buildings and structures in Orléans
Basilica churches in France
Churches in Loiret
Roman Catholic cathedrals in France